CONCACAF Women's Gold Cup may refer to:

 CONCACAF W Championship, known as the CONCACAF Women's Gold Cup from 2000 to 2006, international women's football tournament beginning in 1991 that decides the champions of CONCACAF and serves as qualifying for the FIFA Women's World Cup
 CONCACAF W Gold Cup, international women's football tournament beginning in 2024

See also
 CONCACAF Gold Cup, international men's football tournament that decides the champions of CONCACAF
 Gold Cup (disambiguation)